Fosun International Limited is a Chinese multinational conglomerate holding company. Founded in 1992 by Guo Guangchang and four others, the company is headquartered in Shanghai and was incorporated in Hong Kong in 2004. Its Co-CEOs are Chen Qiyu and Xu Xiaoliang. Wang Qunbin joined Guo Guangchang as co-chairman in early 2020. The company is located in 16 countries and is one of the largest privately owned conglomerates in China. It was ranked 371st on the Forbes Global 2000 ranking in 2020.

History

1990s 
Fosun Group was founded in 1992 as the Guangxin Technology Development Company by five graduates of Fudan University in Shanghai: Guo Guangchang, Liang Xinjun, Wang Qunbin, Fan Wei, and Tan Jian.  Fosun started its business by doing market research. The major holding company of the group, Fosun High Technology, was incorporated in 1994 in mainland China. Then Fosun extended its business into the healthcare industry (as Fosun Pharmaceutical), real estate, and steel etc.

2000s 
In 2004, a new holding company of the group, Fosun International Limited was incorporated in Hong Kong. In July 2007, Fosun International was listed on the main board of the Stock Exchange of Hong Kong as SEHK:656.

2010s 
During 2011, the three major growth engines of Fosun, industrial profits, investment profits and asset management profits rose rapidly, enabling Fosun to make strides toward its vision of becoming "a premium investment group with a focus on China's growth momentum".

From 2010 through 2015, Fosun spent billions buying foreign firms in the healthcare, tourism, fashion, and banking industries in the US and Europe. These included France's Club Med, Britain's Thomas Cook Group, Canada's Cirque du Soleil, American clothing label St John, and Greek jeweler Folli Follie. At the end of 2014 Fosun acquired the US insurer Meadowbrook for around $433 million, marking the first full purchase of a US insurer by a Chinese company. Fosun also purchased Australian oil company Roc Oil, its first acquisition in the petroleum industry.

On 11 December 2015, the chairman of Fosun, Guo Guangchang, was reported missing. Guo however reappeared on 14 December 2015 at a Fosun board of directors meeting. During his disappearance, Fosun requested that trading of shares be temporarily suspended. The Fosun board of directors issued a statement saying that Guo was assisting in a government inquiry which, in their opinion, did not present a “material adverse impact” on Fosun's finances or operations.

On 21 July 2016, it was confirmed that Fosun had bought the English football club Wolverhampton Wanderers from its previous owner Steve Morgan for an estimated £45 million. Under Fosun's ownership, Wolves have progressed from being a mid table side in the Football League Championship (second tier of English football) to finishing seventh in the FA Premier League, reaching an FA Cup semi-final and qualifying for the UEFA Europa League.

In 2016 Fosun began to invest in India. “Delhivery” was one such investment made in 2017, in addition to previous investments in MakeMyTrip, India's largest online travel company and Gland Pharma. Fosun is also involved in the Indian real estate market.

On 28 August 2019, Thomas Cook Group announced that the group "had agreed the main terms of a rescue package that will see Hong Kong’s Fosun Tourism take over its tour operations and creditor banks and bondholders acquire its airline"

In early November 2019, Fosun said it would purchase the Thomas Cook brand for £11m. The company viewed itself as a "potential saviour" by purchasing the name.

2020s 
In March 2020, the company acquired a 55.4% equity interest in French jewelry brand Djula. They also signed an agreement in July 2020 with a high-end Italian jewelry group to develop the Damiani and Salvini brands in China. In August 2020 the company bought a 30% stake in Jinhui Liquor for $262 million.

In 2022, after has been severely hit by the effects of the COVID-19 pandemic and China's extreme lockdown policies, the Shanghai-based conglomerate divested many of its key assets to avoid defaulting on its short-term debts. By October 2022, Fosun announced that it would sell as much as $11 billion of assets within the next 12 months, amid efforts to bolster both its balance sheet and investor confidence.

Response to COVID-19 pandemic 
During the coronavirus pandemic of 2020, Fosun Pharmaceuticals partnered with German biotech firm Biopharmaceutical New Technologies (BioNTech) to produce and distribute the COVID-19 mRNA vaccine BNT162b2. Once approved, Fosun will market the vaccine in China, and BioNTech will retain the rights to sell it internationally.

Fosun was part of an alliance of Chinese companies that donated medical supplies to 23 countries during the COVID-19 pandemic.

In March 2020, Fosun brought medical supplies to Milan, Italy, including 5,500 protective suits and 40,000 N95 respirator masks together with the Longfor Group and Beijing Taikiang Yicai Foundation. This donation was in addition to 5,000 masks that had been donated to Milan's municipal government earlier by Fosun.

Fosun launched the Global anti-Virus Relief Scheme which created a forum for China, the US, the UK, and Portugal to share information and experience about COVID-19 in early March 2020. Several companies have also joined the effort, including Baidu, New Oriental, Xiaomi and Sequoia Capital. Fosun has distributed close to 4 million units of medical supplies around the world, including surgical masks, protective suits, and diagnostic reagents.

Fosun donated medical protection supplies to South Korea in two shipments in March, 36,000 early in the month and additional 22,000 later in the month. The company also donated supplies to the UK, Japan and India.

At the end of March 2020, the Chinese National Medical Products Administration gave Fosun Pharmaceutical emergency approval for the use of a novel coronavirus nucleic acid detection kit that it developed.

Fosun, Haitong Securities, and the Portuguese football agency Gestifute brought 461 kilos representing 58,400 units of medical supplies to Shanghai’s sister city in Portugal, Porto at the end of March 2020.

Fosun delivered medical supplies in several shipments during March 2020 to the city of Wolverhampton, UK, the home of the Wolves football team, which is owned by Fosun.

The company donated N95 masks to New York's NYU Langone Medical Center and Mount Sinai Hospital as well as similar donations to hospitals in Chicago, Boston, New Jersey, California and elsewhere in the United States. The Coalition of Asian-American IPA (CAIPA) accepted 7,000 N95 masks from Fosun, and then distributed them to hospitals throughout the New York area during March 2020.

Business structure

Fosun has a wide array of business activities, including investing in other firms, managing a number of private equity funds, and entering joint ventures.

Equity investments 
Fosun has invested in a number of businesses throughout different sectors, such as asset management, insurance, and industrial operations.

Asset management 

IDERA (98.00%)
China Financial Services Holdings (4.9%)
 Fosun Eurasia Capital (in Russia)
Hauck & Aufhäuser (99.91%)
Resolution Property (in UK)
Rio Bravo Investmentos (in Brazil)

Banking 

 Banco Comercial Português (27.06%)
 China Minsheng Bank (2.22%)
 Mybank (25.00%)

Entertainment 

Cirque du Soleil (25% via private equity funds managed by Fosun International and associated company Yuyuan Tourist Mart)
 Studio 8 (60%)
Wolverhampton Wanderers F.C.

Fashion 

Formerly named Fosun Fashion, the fashion sector of Fosun's business is now named Lanvin Group.

 Ahava (99.46%)
 Caruso (73.90%)
 Folli Follie (10%, additional 3.89% stake held by Pramerica-Fosun China Opportunity Fund)
 Lanvin
 Silver Cross (87.23%)
 Sergio Rossi
 St John (70.00%)
 Tom Tailor (28.89%)
 Wolford

Food and drink 
 Jinhui Liquor
 Sanyuan Foods (20.45%)
 St Hubert (98.12%)
 Tsingtao Brewery (17.99%)

Industrial operations 

Cainiao (6.77%)
Delhivery (6.5%)
Fosun Pharmaceutical (37.94%)
Gland Pharma (57.86%)
Hainan Mining (51.57%)
 Fosun High Technology (100%)
Roc Oil (100%)
Sinopharm Group
Sisram Medical
Zhaojin Mining (3.57%)

Insurance 

Ameritrust Group (100%)
Fidelidade (84.99%)
Fosun United Health Insurance (20.00%)
NAGICO Insurances (through Peak Reinsurance)
Peak Reinsurance (86.93%)
Pramerica Fosun Life Insurance (50.00%)
New China Life Insurance (3.28%)
United Family Healthcare
Yong'an P&C Insurance (40.68%)

Investment 

 Fosun Finance (86%)
 Fosun Hani Securities (100%)
Miacom Diagnostics
Guide Investimentos (in Brazil)

Media 

 Focus Media (5.00%)

Private hospitals 

 Chancheng Hospital
Luz Saúde (98.79%)
Starcastle Senior Living (50.00%)

Real estate 

Shanghai Forte Land (100%)
Shanghai Zendai Property (14.0%)
 Fosun Property Holdings (100%)
126 Madison Avenue (New York)
28 Liberty Street (New York)
73 Miller Street (Sydney)
Citigroup Center (Tokyo)
Lloyds Chambers (London)
The Bund Finance Center (50.00%)

Retail 

 Secret Recipe
 Yuyuan Tourist Mart (26.45%)

Technology 
 iFlytek (strategic minority stake)
 Perfect World
 The Floow Limited (15%)
 WeDoctor

Tourism 

 Atlantis Sanya Resort (99.81%)
Club Med (90.10%)
 MakeMyTrip (1%)
Thomas Cook Holidays

Fosun-managed private equity funds

 Carlyle-Fosun
 Fosun Capital
 Fosun RZ Capital
 Fosun Chuanghong
 Ji'nan Financial Development Investment Fund
 Pramerica-Fosun China Opportunity Fund
 Shanghai Sunvision Binhe Equity Investment Center
 Shanghai Sunvision Xicheng Equity Investment Center
 Star Capital (Shanghai Star Equity Investment L.P.)
 Weishi Fund
 Zhejiang Growth Fund

Joint ventures
 Nanjing Nangang Iron and Steel United (60% share capital, 50% voting rights)
 Besino Environment (100%)
Koller (84.50%)
Nanjing Iron and Steel Company (48.19%)
 Pramerica–Fosun Life Insurance (50%)

Former equity investments 

China Huarong Asset Management
 Ironshore
Thomas Cook Group Plc  (5.76% via Fidelidade) - Entered Compulsory Liquidation 23 September 2019

Shareholders
The major shareholder of Fosun International was a Hong Kong incorporated company Fosun Holdings, which was a wholly owned subsidiary of British Virgin Islands incorporated company Fosun International Holdings. Three founders of Fosun International, Guo Guangchang, Liang Xinjun and Wang Qunbin, owned 64.45%, 24.44% and 11.11% respectively in Fosun International Holdings. Fan Wei, another founder, withdrew his stake in Fosun International Holdings in September 2015.

References

External links
 Official website

 
Companies listed on the Hong Kong Stock Exchange
Conglomerate companies of China
Civilian-run enterprises of China
Companies based in Shanghai
Chinese brands
Chinese companies established in 1992
Conglomerate companies established in 1992